Paolo Vincenzo Rovero, B. or Paolo Vincenzo Roero or Paolo Vincenzo Roverio (died 25 October 1665) was a Roman Catholic prelate who served as Bishop of Asti (1655–1665).

Biography
Paolo Vincenzo Rovero was born in Italy and ordained a priest in the Clerics Regular of Saint Paul.
On 5 October 1655, he was appointed during the papacy of Pope Innocent X as Bishop of Asti.
On 31 October 1655, he was consecrated bishop by Marcantonio Franciotti, Cardinal-Priest of Santa Maria della Pace. 
He served as Bishop of Asti until his death on 25 October 1665.

While bishop, he was the principal co-consecrator of Filiberto Alberto Bailly, Bishop of Aosta (1659); and Michael Angelus Broglia, Bishop of Vercelli (1663).

References

External links and additional sources
 (for Chronology of Bishops) 
 (for Chronology of Bishops) 

17th-century Italian Roman Catholic bishops
Bishops appointed by Pope Innocent X
1665 deaths
Barnabite bishops